Rouse is a census-designated place (CDP) in Stanislaus County, California. The 2010 United States census reported Rouse's population was 2,005.

Geography
According to the United States Census Bureau, the CDP covers an area of 0.2 square miles (0.6 km), all of it land.

Demographics
The 2010 United States Census reported that Rouse had a population of 2,005. The racial makeup of Rouse was 896 (44.7%) White, 101 (5.0%) African American, 24 (1.2%) Native American, 199 (9.9%) Asian, 12 (0.6%) Pacific Islander, 658 (32.8%) from other races, and 115 (5.7%) from two or more races. Hispanic or Latino of any race were 1,280 persons (63.8%).

The Census reported that 2,005 people (100% of the population) lived in households, 0 (0%) lived in non-institutionalized group quarters, and 0 (0%) were institutionalized.

There were 483 households, out of which 286 (59.2%) had children under the age of 18 living in them, 212 (43.9%) were opposite-sex married couples living together, 121 (25.1%) had a female householder with no husband present, 70 (14.5%) had a male householder with no wife present.  There were 74 (15.3%) unmarried opposite-sex partnerships, and 4 (0.8%) same-sex married couples or partnerships. 42 households (8.7%) were made up of individuals, and 16 (3.3%) had someone living alone who was 65 years of age or older. The average household size was 4.15.  There were 403 families (83.4% of all households); the average family size was 4.21.

The population was spread out, with 699 people (34.9%) under the age of 18, 265 people (13.2%) aged 18 to 24, 512 people (25.5%) aged 25 to 44, 399 people (19.9%) aged 45 to 64, and 130 people (6.5%) who were 65 years of age or older.  The median age was 25.9 years. For every 100 females, there were 109.7 males.  For every 100 females age 18 and over, there were 106.6 males.

The homeowner vacancy rate was 2.9%; the rental vacancy rate was 11.6%.  665 people (33.2% of the population) lived in owner-occupied housing units and 1,340 people (66.8%) lived in rental housing units.

References

Census-designated places in Stanislaus County, California
Census-designated places in California